Bonygutt Brook  is a tributary of Green Brook  in Union and Middlesex Counties, New Jersey in the United States.

Bonygutt Brook flows from the city of Plainfield to Middlesex.

See also
List of rivers of New Jersey

References

Tributaries of the Raritan River
Rivers of New Jersey
Rivers of Middlesex County, New Jersey
Rivers of Union County, New Jersey